Kevin Vermeulen (born 20 November 1990) is a Dutch professional footballer who plays as a midfielder for Kozakken Boys. He formerly played for Excelsior, RKC Waalwijk and FC Dordrecht.

Club career
On 1 July 2022, Vermeulen signed a two-year contract with Kozakken Boys.

References

External links
 
 Voetbal International profile 

1990 births
Living people
Dutch footballers
Excelsior Rotterdam players
RKC Waalwijk players
FC Dordrecht players
Kozakken Boys players
Eredivisie players
Eerste Divisie players
Footballers from Zwijndrecht, Netherlands
Association football midfielders